Bull's Head Inn may refer to:

Australia 

 Royal Bull's Head Inn, heritage-listed former hotel in Drayton, Queensland, Australia

United Kingdom 

 Bull's Head Inn, Poole, a listed former inn in Poole, Dorset, England
 Bull's Head Inn, old coaching house in Belper Lane End, Derbyshire, England
 Bull's Head, Strand-on-the-Green, a listed public house in Chiswick, London, England 
 The Bull's Head, Barnes, a pub in Barnes, Richmond-upon-Thames, London, England 
 The Bull's Head Hotel, one of the Early grounds of Manchester City F.C. in Manchester, England

United States 

 Bull's Head Inn, oldest building in the Cobleskill Historic District, Schoharie County, New York, USA